Janine Carmen Habeck (born 3 June 1983) is a German model. She was born in Berlin. Her father is German and her mother is Italian.

Habeck was the Playmate of the Month (PMOM) for February 2004 and Playmate of the Year in 2005 (2004 by German Playboy notation) for the German edition of Playboy. She was later the September PMOM in 2006 for the United States edition of the magazine.

In November 2005, Habeck was awarded the title Miss Centerfold by readers of the German edition of Playboy, celebrating the 400th issue of the magazine.

References

External links
 
 

1983 births
Glamour models
Living people
Models from Berlin
German female models
German people of Italian descent
2000s Playboy Playmates